Events in the year 2023 in Togo.

Incumbents 

 President: Faure Gnassingbé
 Prime Minister: Victoire Tomegah Dogbé

Events 
Ongoing — COVID-19 pandemic in Togo

Scheduled 
December - 2023 Togolese parliamentary election.

Death

References 

 
2020s in Togo
Years of the 21st century in Togo
Togo
Togo